The Melbourne Cinémathèque is a non-profit film society screening programmes year-round, dedicated to presenting the history of world cinema on the big screen in carefully curated retrospectives. It started out as Melbourne University Film Society (MUFS) in 1948 and changed its name to Cinémathèque in 1984. It screens at the Australian Centre for the Moving Image (ACMI).
 
The Melbourne Cinémathèque screens archival 35mm and 16mm film prints from organisations such as the British Film Institute, Library of Congress (Washington, USA), UCLA Film & TV Archive etc. The Melbourne Cinémathèque's mission is to present films in the medium they were created, and as closely as possible to screen them the way they would have originally screened, (i.e. big screen 16 & 35mm prints, not video or DVD). Programmes include a diverse selection of classic and contemporary films showcasing director retrospectives, special guest appearances and thematic series including archival material and many new prints. Seasons have included A Band of Outsiders: The Cinematic Underworld of Jean-Pierre Melville, 'All Art is One': The Visionary Cinema of Michael Powell and Emeric Pressburger, Life is Art: The World of Jean Renoir, Glacial Crossroads: The Cinema of Michael Haneke, Surviving Kane: Around the World with Orson Welles, and The Music of Time: The World of Max Ophüls, as well as programmes dedicated to German Noir, Yasujirō Ozu, Marco Bellocchio, Agnès Varda, Manoel de Oliveira and Barbara Stanwyck, amongst others. The Melbourne Cinémathèque is self-administered, non-profit, membership-driven and relies on support from individuals, foundations, corporations and government funding to maintain its high standard of excellence.

External links 
Official website
Cinémathèque page at ACMI

Culture of Melbourne
Film organisations in Australia
1948 establishments in Australia
Arts organizations established in 1948